Parkgate Football Club is an English football club based in Parkgate, Rotherham, South Yorkshire. They play in the Northern Counties East Football League Division One, at level 10 of the English football league system.

History
The club was established in 1969 as BSC Parkgate and played in the Hatchard and Sheffield Association leagues before joining the Yorkshire League in 1974. In 1979 they were promoted from Division Three to Division Two, and when the league merged with the Midland League to form the Northern Counties East League (NCEL) in 1982, Parkgate were entered into Division One South of the new competition.

In 1986 they were promoted to the NCEL Division One. Two years after changing their name to RES Parkgate in 1990, they installed floodlights, and in 1994 they changed their name again, this time to just Parkgate. The 1997–98 season saw Parkgate reach the final of the Sheffield & Hallamshire Senior Cup for the first time, losing to Emley at Hillsborough (they lost two further finals in 2006 and 2011).

They were finally promoted to the NCEL Premier Division in 2007 when they won the Division One title, and they have remained in this division ever since, reaching a high point in 2011 when they finished as league runners-up.

The Steelmen suffered relegation from the NCEL Premier Division at the end of the 2017–18 season under the guidance of Manager Billy Fox.

Following a poor start to the 2018–19 Division One season, manager Billy Fox was relieved of his position as manager leaving the club with 1 point from the first 6 games. Chairman Albert Dudill quickly appointed former player Andy Dawson as First Team Manager, Lee Whitehead as assistant manager and Ben Starosta as player-coach.

Season-by-season record

Notable former players
Players that have played in the Football League either before or after playing for Parkgate –

 Jimmy Ghaichem
 Kyle Nix
 Zephaniah Thomas
 Ben Starosta
 Simon Harrison

Ground
The club plays at the Roundwood Sports Complex, off Green Lane, Rawmarsh, postcode S62 6LD.

Gallery

Honours

League
Northern Counties East League Premier Division
Runners-up: 2010–11Northern Counties East League Division One
Promoted: 2006–07 (Champions)
Northern Counties East League Division Two
Promoted: 1985–86

CupSheffield & Hallamshire Senior CupRunners-up: 1997–98, 2005–06, 2010–11Northern Counties East League Cup
Runners-up: 2007–08
Northern Counties East League Trophy
Winners: 2006–07
Runners-up: 1998–99Rotherham Charity Cup'''
Winners: 1983–84, 1998–99
Runners-up: 1996–97

Records
Best FA Cup performance: 2nd Qualifying Round, 1997–98, 1998–99
Best FA Vase performance: 3rd Round, 2011–12, 2012–13
Record Attendance 1536 -v- Rotherham United (Friendly) 2019

References

External links
 Official website https://www.pitchero.com/clubs/parkgatefc

Football clubs in England
Football clubs in South Yorkshire
Sport in Rotherham
Association football clubs established in 1969
1969 establishments in England
Sheffield & Hallamshire County FA members
Hatchard League
Sheffield Association League
Yorkshire Football League
Northern Counties East Football League
Works association football teams in England